Yatishwaranand is an Indian politician and member of the Bharatiya Janata Party. Yatishwaranand is a member of the Uttarakhand Legislative Assembly from the Haridwar Rural constituency in Haridwar district. He is currently Minister of State (independent charge) in Teerath Singh Rawat led state government effective from March 12, 2021.

References 

People from Haridwar
Bharatiya Janata Party politicians from Uttarakhand
Members of the Uttarakhand Legislative Assembly
Living people
Uttarakhand MLAs 2017–2022
Year of birth missing (living people)